The 1924 Cork Intermediate Hurling Championship was the 15th staging of the Cork Intermediate Hurling Championship since its establishment by the Cork County Board.

Passage won the championship following a 3–0 to 2–0 defeat of Sarsfields in the final.

Results

Final

References

Cork Intermediate Hurling Championship
Cork Intermediate Hurling Championship